Sterculia foetida is a soft wooded tree that can grow up to  tall. Common names for the plant are the bastard poon tree, java olive tree, hazel sterculia, wild almond tree, and skunk tree.

Description
The branches of Sterculia foetida are arranged in whorls; they spread horizontally. The tree's bark is smooth and gray. The leaflets are elliptical, 100–170 mm long, and shortly petioluled  The petioles are the source of the foul smell of the plant. The green or purple flowers are large and unisexual as the tree is dioecious (male and female flowers are found on different trees). The pollens are oval in shape, approximately 40 microns in length. The fruit consists of four to five follicles, each follicle generally containing 10–15 seeds. The follicles are scarlet when ripe.
In India, flowers appear in March, and the leaves appear between March and April. At Hyderabad (India), flowering was observed in September–October (2015) with ripened fruits on the top part and young green fruits at the lower branches. The fruit is ripe in February (11 months after the flowers appeared).

Taxonomy
The species was described in 1753 by Carl Linnaeus. It is the type species of the genus Sterculia and both names mean bad-smelling: the name Sterculia comes from Sterquilinus, the Roman god of fertilizer or manure.

Distribution
Sterculia foetida has been found in many areas, including India, Taiwan, Indochina, the Philippines (where it is known as kalumpang), United States (Hawaii), Indonesia, Ghana, Australia, Mozambique, and Togo.

Toxicity and uses
The oil of Sterculia foetida has been found to be comparable to sunflower, soybean, and grapeseed oils for the use of biofuels. Sterculia foetida oil contains cyclopropene fatty acids (CPFA) such as 8,9 methylene-heptadec-8-enoic acid (malvalic acid) and 9,10-methylene-ocadec-9-enoic acid (sterculic acid). The flash point, iodine value, free fatty acid count, phosphorus content, cloud point, pour point, viscosity at 40 °C, oxidative stability at 110 °C, density, and trace metal count are all within ASTM and EN specifications.

Evidence suggests that the seeds are edible, but purgative, and should be roasted prior to eating. At least one review indicates that CPFA such as sterculic acid are carcinogenic, co-carcinogenic, and have medical and other effects on animals; according to this review, "CPFA in food is dangerous to human health".

In Vietnam, the tree is called Trôm and its sap is harvested to use as a soft drink called "Mủ Trôm".

Gallery

References

foetida
Trees of China
Trees of Indo-China
Trees of Malesia
Trees of Hawaii
Flora of Ghana
Trees of Australia
Flora of Mozambique
Flora of Togo
Biofuels
Dioecious plants
Flora without expected TNC conservation status